Darío Ismael Benedetto (born 17 May 1990) is an Argentine professional footballer who plays as a striker for Argentine Primera División club Boca Juniors.

Club career

Early career
Darío Benedetto began his career playing for Arsenal de Sarandí in 2008. He was loaned out to Defensa y Justicia in 2010, and then to Gimnasia in 2011, appearing in 19 matches and scoring 11 goals.

Tijuana
In the summer of 2013, Arsenal sold Benedetto to Mexican club Xolos de Tijuana. On 19 July, he scored a hat-trick on his league debut for the club in a 3–3 draw against Atlas at the Estadio Caliente. Benedetto would not score again until 1 November, scoring a brace against Atlante. For the 2014 Clausura, Benedetto managed to score 7 goals for the club, and scored one in the quarter-finals of the play-offs. The following tournament, the 2014 Apertura, Benedetto scored 9 goals for Tijuana, making him the fourth-best goal scorer of the tournament, behind leaders Mauro Boselli and Camilo Sanvezzo, who scored 12 goals, and Dorlan Pabón, who scored 11 goals. He also had 4 assists. In total, Benedetto scored 21 goals in 43 appearances for Xolos.

América
On 15 December 2014, it was announced that Benedetto was sold to Club América on a four-year contract. Though details of the transfer went undisclosed, it was believed that América paid US$8 million for the player. He made his debut on 10 January 2015 in América's opening game of the Clausura tournament, a 3–2 victory over León at the Estadio Azteca, providing the assist for Oribe Peralta's second goal. He scored his first goal in a league game against Tigres UANL.

Benedetto was named the best player of the 2014–15 CONCACAF Champions League, and also won the Golden Boot with teammate Oribe Peralta, scoring seven goals in three matches; four in the 6–0 win over Herediano in the second leg of the semi-finals, and a hat-trick in the 5–3 aggregate victory over Montreal Impact in the Finals.

Boca Juniors

On 6 June 2016, Benedetto left to Boca Juniors from America after asking for the transfer. On 25 September, he scored a hat-trick in a 4–1 win against Quilmes at La Bombonera. Although resisted at first, he was the MVP that lead Boca Juniors to is 32nd national title.

On 19 November 2017, Benedetto ruptured his ACL in a match against Racing Club. He was subsequently ruled out for six months. Benedetto scored 30 goals in 34 appearances across his first two Superliga campaigns with Boca but was on target just twice in 15 outings in 2018–19 after returning from the knee and Achilles injuries.

Marseille
On 5 August 2019, Benedetto signed a four-year deal with Ligue 1 side Olympique de Marseille for a reported fee of €14 million. He was given the number 9 shirt.  Benedetto scored his first goal as a Marseille player in the first half of a match against OGC Nice on 28 August 2019.

Elche (loan) 
On 19 August 2021, Benedetto joined La Liga side Elche CF on a loan deal from Marseille.

Boca Juniors
On 21 January 2022, Benedetto returned to Boca Juniors.

International career
On 27 August 2017, Benedetto received his first senior call-up by coach Jorge Sampaoli for Argentina's 2018 World Cup qualifying matches against Uruguay and Venezuela. He made his international debut on 5 September 2017 vs. Venezuela, he came on to replace Paulo Dybala as a substitute, the match ended 1–1.

Style of play
Benedetto is a complete striker praised for  his eye for goal, his altruism, his sense of collective and his athletic qualities that make him a player appreciated by coaches. He is an excellent finisher and enhances his team's attacking game. He can play as a "goal poacher" but also knows to play as a winger or lower on the field to use his technical skills and participate in the construction of the game.

Career statistics

Club

International

Honours
América
CONCACAF Champions League: 2014–15, 2015–16
	
Boca Juniors
Argentine Primera División: 2016–17, 2017–18, 2022
Copa de la Liga Profesional: 2022
Supercopa Argentina: 2018, 2022
	
Individual
CONCACAF Champions League Golden Ball: 2014–15	
CONCACAF Champions League Top Goalscorer: 2014–15
Footballer of the Year of Argentina: 2017
Argentine Primera División top scorer: 2016–17

References

External links
 
 

1990 births
Living people
Association football forwards
Argentine footballers
Argentine expatriate footballers
Argentina international footballers
Gimnasia y Esgrima de Jujuy footballers
Arsenal de Sarandí footballers
Defensa y Justicia footballers
Club Tijuana footballers
Club América footballers
Boca Juniors footballers
Olympique de Marseille players
Elche CF players
Argentine Primera División players
Primera Nacional players
Liga MX players
Ligue 1 players
La Liga players
Expatriate footballers in Mexico
Expatriate footballers in France
Expatriate footballers in Spain
Argentine expatriate sportspeople in Mexico
Argentine expatriate sportspeople in France
Argentine expatriate sportspeople in Spain
People from Berazategui Partido
Naturalized citizens of Mexico
Sportspeople from Buenos Aires Province